Maciej Wojciech Slesicki (born 1966 in Warsaw) is a Polish film director and screenwriter, co-founder and lecturer at the Warsaw Film School.

His mother was film producer Barbara Pec-Ślesicka.

Awards and nominations
 1995: The Polish Gdynia Film Festival - Award for directing (Tato)
 1996: Golden Duck magazine Film in the category of best Polish film; for the year 1995 (Tato)
1996: Tarnów Film Award awarded by the jury youth for his directorial debut (Tato)
1996: Tarnów Film Award  Maszkaron - Audience Award (Tato)
 1997: Distributor Award at the Polish Film Festival in Gdynia (Sara)
2003: Grand Prize Laurel Yew MF Film-Music-Painting  Summer of Muses  in Nowogard (Show)
 2015: 87th Academy Awards - Nomination Best Documentary (Short Subject) (Nasza klątwa)
 2021: 94th Academy Awards - Nomination Best Documentary (Short Subject) (The Dress)

References

External links
 

1966 births
Film people from Warsaw
Polish film directors
University of Silesia in Katowice alumni
Living people